Margalida Crespí Jaume (born 15 August 1990, Palma de Mallorca) is a Spanish competitor in synchronized swimming. She won a bronze medal in the team competition at the 2012 Summer Olympics.

Notes

References

External links 
 
 

Living people
Olympic bronze medalists for Spain
Spanish synchronized swimmers
Olympic synchronized swimmers of Spain
Synchronized swimmers at the 2012 Summer Olympics
Olympic medalists in synchronized swimming
1990 births
Medalists at the 2012 Summer Olympics
World Aquatics Championships medalists in synchronised swimming
Synchronized swimmers at the 2013 World Aquatics Championships
Synchronized swimmers at the 2011 World Aquatics Championships
Synchronized swimmers at the 2009 World Aquatics Championships
People from Palma de Mallorca